Walter Moreira Salles, also Walther Moreira Salles (May 28, 1912 – 2001), was a Brazilian banker, politician and philanthropist, considered as one of the founders of the modern Brazilian banking industry.

Career
Moreira Salles was born in 1912 in Pouso Alegre, Minas Gerais. He graduated from the Faculty of Law of Largo de São Francisco, University of São Paulo.

In 1940, Banco Moreira Salles merged with three regional banks, eventually changing its name to União de Bancos Brasileiros (Unibanco). Moreira Salles implemented a series of successful acquisitions and an emphasis on human resources, helping to make Unibanco one of Brazil's top three banking institutions. In 1991, Moreira Salles retired as chairman of the board after a 60-year career to become honorary chairman, taking over the conglomerate's cultural activities.

In 1990-91 Moreira Salles launched the Instituto Moreira Salles (IMS), a nonprofit organization whose goal is to promote the development of cultural projects in five areas: photography, literature, libraries, visual arts and Brazilian music. Moreira Salles became the first President of the Instituto. A year later IMS opened the Casa de Cultura de Poços de Caldas, in the city where Casa Moreira Salles was founded. The organization now has cultural centres in Rio de Janeiro, São Paulo, Poços de Caldas and Belo Horizonte, and four galleries, in São Paulo, Rio de Janeiro, Curitiba and Porto Alegre.

Poços de Caldas Airport is named after him.

Political involvement

Moreira Salles was also involved in Brazilian politics. He was the country's ambassador to the United States in the 1950s, serving in Washington D.C. twice during the decade. 
He was Secretary of the Treasury in the cabinet of João Goulart, and gained the favour of President Juscelino Kubitschek for his work as a conciliator in his diplomatic incursions. In the 1950s he helped negotiate the growing problem of Brazil's external debt on three occasions, during the governments of Getúlio Vargas, Kubitschek and Jânio Quadros.

Personal and family life
Moreira Salles had many celebrity friends, including the rock musician Mick Jagger, Brazilian President Fernando Henrique Cardoso, and the actress Greta Garbo. Moreira Salles died in 2001, at Araras, in the district of Petrópolis, in Rio, of causes not disclosed by his family.

His four sons are Pedro Moreira Salles, current president of Unibanco; filmmaker Walter Salles; documentarian João Moreira Salles; publisher Fernando Moreira Salles.

Salles was married three times, to Helène Matarazzo, the mother of Fernando, whom he divorced at the age of 28; Eliza Gonçalves, the mother of Pedro, Walter and João, and his wife until the early 1970s; and Lúcia, whom he married in 1986.

References

External links
 Instituto Moreira Salles

1912 births
2001 deaths
Finance Ministers of Brazil
Brazilian bankers
People from Minas Gerais
Ambassadors of Brazil to the United States
Salles family